Lycus foliaceus is a species of beetle belonging to the Lycidae family.

Description
Males of the species have expanded elytra, with prominent shoulders and a blackish apex. Those of females are comparatively narrow.

Distribution
This species occurs in Sierra Leone and Guinea-Bissau.

References

Lycidae